Geoff Roes (born in Central New York, April 14, 1976) is an American ultra-marathon runner.

Career
Roes was raised in Cleveland, New York and excelled in track and cross country at Paul V. Moore High School in Central Square, NY. He competed in cross-country at Syracuse University for one year before becoming injured. Roes took a hiatus from competitive running until trying his hand at ultra marathon running in 2006 when he won his first event, the Little Susitna 50K. In 2007, he set a course record in the process of winning the Susitna 100 miler. In 2010 Roes won the American River 50 Mile Endurance Run. Roes also won the 2010 Western States Endurance Run in a record time of 15:07:04. Roes set the still-standing course record for the Wasatch 100 (a 100-mile race along the Wasatch Front range of the Rocky Mountains near Salt Lake City, UT) in 2009 with a time of 18:30:55, beating the previous course record by nearly one hour and five minutes. Roes now resides in Juneau, Alaska.

References

External links
 Geoff Roes' blog

Living people
1976 births
American male ultramarathon runners